The Sydney Turpentine-Ironbark Forest (STIF) is wet sclerophyll forest community of Sydney, New South Wales, Australia, that is typically found in the Inner West and Northern region of Sydney. It is also among the three of these plant communities which have been classified as Endangered, under the New South Wales government's Threatened Species Conservation Act 1995, with only around 0.5% of its original pre-settlement range remaining. 

As of 26 August 2005, the Australian Government reclassified Sydney Turpentine-Ironbark Forest as a "Critically Endangered Ecological Community", under the Commonwealth's Environment Protection and Biodiversity Conservation Act 1999. The original extent of the forest was 26,516 ha, but now only 1,182 ha (or 4.5% of original extent) remains. It is a transitional biome between Cumberland Plain Woodland in the drier areas and Blue Gum High Forest on neighboring higher rainfall ridges.

Characteristics
Sydney Turpentine-Ironbark Forest contains trees which are around 20–30 metres tall, with ground cover composed of flowering shrubs and native grasses. This type of forest prefers a fertile clay soil derived from shale, with undulating hills and moderate rainfall. Its range does not extend to drier Cumberland Plain Woodland, or high-rainfall ridges (where it meets with Blue Gum High Forest, also endangered), or areas with less fertile, sandy soil.

The main canopy trees in this forest community are Turpentine (Syncarpia glomulifera, can grow over 30 metres high), and a number of different species of Ironbark, which vary depending on local environmental conditions. Grey Ironbark (Eucalyptus paniculata), Narrow-leaved Ironbark (Eucalyptus crebra), Red Ironbark or Broad-leaved Ironbark (Eucalyptus fibrosa), and Grey Gum (Eucalyptus punctata) are commonly found species in the Cumberland Plain area. On the shale caps of the Hornsby plateau, Grey Ironbark and Mountain Mahogany (Eucalyptus notabilis) have been noted as being found in association with Turpentine. At the upper end of its rainfall/elevation range, Turpentine-Ironbark forest may intermingle with Blue Gum High Forest and be dominated by Blue Gum (Eucalyptus saligna), Mountain Grey Gum (Eucalyptus cypellocarpa), Round-leaved Gum (Eucalyptus deanei) or Grey Gum.

Understorey plants include wattles such as Parramatta Green Wattle (Acacia parramattensis) and Sydney Golden Wattle (Acacia longifolia), the Common Hop Bush (Dodonaea triquetra), as well as native grasses, herbs and flowers such as Kangaroo Grass (Themeda australis) and Australian Bluebell (Wahlenbergia gracilis).

Plant species growing in Sydney Turpentine-Ironbark Forest typically number upwards of 70, although fewer species are found in the smaller surviving pockets, and some may not be visible above ground, awaiting climatic conditions favourable for seed germination.

Distribution
The natural distribution of Sydney Turpentine–Ironbark Forest is limited to the
Sydney Region, and occurs in areas with deep clay soils derived from Wianamatta shale, or shale layers within Hawkesbury sandstone. Occurring on plateaus and hillsides and on the margins of shale cappings over sandstone, it mainly survives today in the local government area of the City of Ryde, where it was probably once the predominant forest type in the area.

STIF grew in clay soils overlaying the sandstone of the Hornsby plateau, as well as in Sydney’s inner-west where the annual rainfall is between 900 and 1,000mm.
Because the land favoured by Sydney Turpentine-Ironbark Forest plant species is very fertile (more so than the sandy soils derived from Hawkesbury sandstone), after British settlement much of the land was cleared for its timber, as well as for subsequent farming activity. Much of this forest type's area of distribution is now occupied by suburban dwellings.

Very few remnants of Sydney Turpentine-Ironbark Forest still exist. The most substantial undisturbed area is the Wallumatta Nature Reserve on the corner of Twin and Cressy roads North Ryde, which is owned and managed by the National Parks and Wildlife Service. Progressively smaller remnants can be found in Stewart Park, Marsfield (at the intersection of Epping and Vimiera roads), in the grounds of Macquarie University, and at Meadowbank Park, Meadowbank.  Another known remnant of significance surviving in Australia is the Newington Forest near Sydney Olympic Park at Homebush. In the early 1990s, the Concord Local Council initiated a regeneration project to restore STIF bushland within the 3.5-hectare Queen Elizabeth II Park, bordered by Gipps, Broughton and Crane streets, and Addison Avenue, Concord. The project is continuing and expanding under the care of the new Canada Bay City Council and the Concord Bushcare Group. While Queen Elizabeth II Park contains a mixture of Sydney Turpentine-Ironbark Forest and non-indigenous species, there is other Sydney Turpentine-Ironbark Forest bushland in the City of Canada Bay area, located on the Department of Health estate surrounding Concord Hospital at Concord West. Located to the south of the main hospital, a relatively intact area of Sydney Turpentine-Ironbark Forest species may be found in the Dame Eadith Walker Reserve at the Yaralla Estate (private grounds of the Dame Edith Walker Hospital).

Outside these few remaining areas, scattered fragments of Sydney Turpentine-Ironbark Forest have been identified in the local government areas of Ashfield, Auburn, Canterbury, Concord, Drummoyne, Leichhardt, Marrickville, Bankstown, Ryde (Darvall Park and Brush Farm Park), Hunters Hill, Baulkham Hills, Ku-ring-gai (Sheldon Forest), Hornsby, Parramatta, Bankstown, Rockdale, Kogarah, Hurstville, and Sutherland. In heavily urbanised areas of the inner western suburbs, forest fragments can exist simply as an isolated tree belonging to a STIF species. The NSW Scientific Committee, an agency of the New South Wales Department of Environment and Climate Change, has noted the importance of identifying these scattered forest fragments in the interest of genetic diversity, as they "may be important sources of propagation material for use in rehabilitation projects."

Ryde City Council is aware of the near-extinction of this indigenous forest environment, and requires that if any tree becomes unsafe and requires removal, that a replacement must be chosen from the list of tree species indigenous to the particular area. The council's website also encourages local residents in appropriate areas to choose trees, shrubs and ground covers indigenous to the Sydney Turpentine-Ironbark Forest.

See also

 Protected areas of New South Wales

References

External links

NSW National Parks & Wildlife Service Information Sheet (includes image of tree canopy)
Sydney turpentine-ironbark forest - endangered ecological community listing (NSW Scientific Committee statement)
NATIVE VEGETATION: Sydney Turpentine-Ironbark Forest (Ryde City Council website)
Wallumatta Nature Reserve (National Parks and Wildlife Service website) 
Image of Sydney Turpentine-Ironbark Forest (website of the NSW Department of Environment & Climate Change)
Image & description of the Turpentine tree (Syncarpia glomulifera) at Plantnet (Royal Botanic Gardens & Domain Trust website)
Image & description of the Grey Ironbark tree (Eucalyptus paniculata) at Plantnet (Royal Botanic Gardens & Domain Trust website)

Geography of Sydney
Forests of New South Wales
Remnant urban bushland
Endangered ecological communities
Eastern Australian temperate forests
Sclerophyll forests